The World Para Swimming European Championships (World Para Swimming European Open Championships), known until 2018 as the IPC Swimming European Championships, are the European continental championships for swimming where athletes with a disability compete. Each Championship is organised by the International Paralympic Committee (IPC) and behind the World Para Swimming Championships and the Summer Paralympic Games is the largest meet for European athletes.

European Championships

All time medal table
As of 2021

 2009 medal table
 2011 medal table
 2014 medal table
 2016 medal table
 2018 medal table
 2021 medal table

 Hong Kong was guest in 2009.
 Argentina, Brazil, Chile, Cuba and Kazakhstan were guests in 2021.

See also
List of IPC world records in swimming
World Para Swimming Championships

References

External links
IPC Swimming webpages

 
International swimming competitions
Swimming competitions in Europe
Parasports competitions
European championships
Paralympic swimming
Recurring sporting events established in 2009